Serious Young Insects were a short lived Australian pop rock band formed in 1980. The group released one studio album and three singles.

History
Serious Young Insects formed in 1980 with Peter Farnan on vocals and guitar, Michael Vallance on vocals and bass guitar and Mark White on vocals and drums. Australian musicologist, Ian McFarlane, described Serious Young Insects as a "quirky, three-piece Melbourne new wave band".

In May 1982, they released the album, Housebreaking, and three singles. Lisa Perry of The Canberra Times praised the album "several times I had to check the cover to see if there were not also some session musos or others contributing to the sounds I was hearing. For a three-piece combo, these lads sure make a good sound". Richard Pleasance, a classically trained guitarist, was a fan and briefly joined the group before it broke up in the following year.

Discography

Albums

Singles

References

Australian pop music groups
Musical groups established in 1980
Musical groups disestablished in 1983